The Kuki-Chin–Naga languages are a geographic clustering of languages of the Sino-Tibetan family in James Matisoff's classification used by Ethnologue, which groups it under the non-monophyletic "Tibeto-Burman". Their genealogical relationship both to each other and to the rest of Sino-Tibetan is unresolved, but Matisoff lumps them together as a convenience pending further research.

The languages are spoken by the ethnically related Naga people of Nagaland, the Chin people of Burma, and the Kuki people. The larger among these languages have communities of several tens of thousands of native speakers, and a few have more than 100,000, such as Mizo (674,756 in India as of 2001), Thadou (150,000) or Lotha language (180,000).

"Kuki" and "Chin" are essentially synonyms, whereas the Naga speak languages belonging to several Sino-Tibetan branches.

Languages
The established branches are:
 Kuki-Chin
 Southern Naga (Northwestern)
 Northern
 Central
 Maraic
 Khomic
 Southern
 Naga
 Ao, in north-central Nagaland
 Angami–Pochuri, in southern Nagaland
 Tangkhul-Maring, in eastern Manipur
 Zeme, in northwestern Manipur
 Meithei, the official language of Manipur
 Karbi

The Konyak languages of Nagaland, also spoken by ethnic Naga, are not grouped within Kuki-Chin–Naga, but rather within Brahmaputran (Sal).

Ethnologue adds Koki, Long Phuri, Makuri, and Para, all unclassified, and all distant from other Naga languages they have been compared to. Koki is perhaps closest to (or one of) the Tangkhulic languages, and the other three may belong together.

Classification
Scott DeLancey (2015) considers Kuki-Chin–Naga to be part of a wider Central Tibeto-Burman group.

The following is a preliminary internal classification of the Kuki-Chin–Naga languages by Hsiu (2021).

Northern Kuki-Chin-Naga linguistic area (linkage)
Greater Central Naga
Makury
Long Phuri
Para (Jejara)
Central Naga
Lotha
Sangtam
Yimchungrü
Ao
Angami-Pochuri
Angamic-Sumic
Angamic
Angami, Chokri
Khezha
Mao
Poumai
Sumic
Sumi
Rengma
Pochuric
Meluri
Ntenyi
Southern Kuki-Chin-Naga branch
Greater Zeme ("Western Naga")
Zeme, Mzieme, Liangmai
Nruanghmei
Maram
Khoirao
Puiron
Greater Tangkhulic
Akyaung Ari
Tangkhulic
Maring, Khoibu
Kokak
Suansu (?)
Southern Naga
Kuki-Chin
Northern
Central
Maraic
Southern
Khomic

References 

Reconstructions
Bruhn, Daniel W. 2014. A phonological reconstruction of Proto-Central Naga. Ph.D. Dissertation, University of California, Berkeley.
Mortensen, David R. 2012. Database of Tangkhulic Languages. (unpublished ms. contributed to STEDT).
VanBik, Kenneth. 2009. Proto-Kuki-Chin: A reconstructed ancestor of the Kuki-Chin languages. STEDT Monograph Series 8. Berkeley, CA: STEDT.
Khoi Lam Thang. 2001. A phonological reconstruction of Proto Chin. M.A. Dissertation, Payap University.
Button, Christopher. 2011. Proto Northern Chin. STEDT Monograph Series 10. Berkeley, CA: STEDT.

External links
Kuki-Chin-Naga (Sino-Tibetan Branches Project)

 

br:Yezhoù koukiek-tchinek